William de Burgh may refer to:

 William de Burgh (1157–1206), Lord of Connaught
 William Óg de Burgh (died 1270), Irish chieftain
 William Donn de Burgh, 3rd Earl of Ulster (1312–1333), noble in the Peerage of Ireland
 William de Burgh (MP) (1741–1808), Anglo-Irish theologian, politician and anti-slavery campaigner
 William de Burgh (philosopher) (1866–1943), British philosopher.

See also
William Burgh (disambiguation)
William Burke (disambiguation), once used interchangeably with de Burgh